The 15 October 2011 global protests were part of a series of protests inspired by the Arab Spring, the Icelandic protests, the Portuguese "Geração à Rasca", the Spanish "Indignants", the Greek protests, and the Occupy movement.  The protests were launched under the slogan "United for #GlobalChange", to which the slogan "United for Global Democracy" was added by many people's assemblies. The protest was first called for by the Spanish Plataforma ¡Democracia Real YA! in May 2011 and endorsed by people's assemblies across the world. Reasons were varied but mainly targeted growing economic inequality, corporate influence over government and international institutions, and the lack of truly democratic institutions allowing direct public participation at all levels, local to global. Global demonstrations were held on 15 October in more than 950 cities in 82 countries. The date was chosen to coincide with the 5-month anniversary of the first protest in Spain. General assemblies, the social network n-1, mailing lists, Mumble voice chat, open pads such as Pirate Pad and Titan Pad, and Facebook were used to coordinate the events. Some protests were only a few hundred in number, whereas others numbered in the hundreds of thousands, with the largest in Madrid numbering half a million and the second largest city Barcelona with 400,000.

Protests

Europe

Spain

As a continuation of the 2011 Spanish Protests, the largest protests took place in Spain, where more than a million people took the streets on 15 October, including 500,000 in Madrid, 400,000 in Barcelona, and 150,000 in Zaragoza. In Madrid, protesters reoccupied the Puerta del Sol square where the Indignados had camped five months earlier on 15 May. As in protests elsewhere, slogans on signs included "We are the 99%", "United for Global Change" and "Human Rights for Everybody".

Italy

At least 300,000 under the banner of "People of Europe: Rise Up!" gathered in the centre of Rome, according to the organizers. During the peaceful march against corporate greed and austerity measures, a group of people broke away from the main demonstration and threw rocks, bottles and incendiary devices at banks and riot police. Riot police charged and clashed with the protesters repeatedly, firing water cannons and tear gas. At least 135 people were injured, including 105 police officers. 12 people were arrested.

United Kingdom

London
5,000 people gathered outside the London Stock Exchange, ending up setting a camp that remained there for three months, in what became known as Occupy London. In the following weeks, camps were set up in dozens of cities around the UK.

Germany

Berlin
10,000 people gathered at the Neptune Fountain in Alexanderplatz between 13:00 and 14:00. At 14:00 the march set off towards the Brandenburg Gate (Brandenburger Tor), arriving to a police barrier at the Pariser Platz square at about 15:00. The march thus made a detour around Brandenburger Tor and marched towards the Kanzleramt, the seat of the federal government of Germany. In front of the Kanzleramt, an open microphone was put in place where anybody could come up and give their thoughts. The sound system was not loud enough for such a big gathering and so it was proposed to use the human microphone (das menschliche Megaphone in German) technique of Occupy Wall Street. The plan had been for everyone to go to Mariannenplatz in the evening where stages, music and food had been prepared. However the people spontaneously decided to assemble in front of the Reichstag and held an assembly there. Tents were put out, and the food was brought from Mariannenplatz. The police came and told the people to disperse. The people refused to disperse and continued their assembly using the human mic. The police then proceeded to destroy the tents which had been put up. After all the tents had been destroyed or confiscated by the police, the police made rounds around the assembly and stole the blankets and mats of the people. At around midnight the police made a final call to disperse and threatened serious consequences for those who stayed. The people decided to stay. The police then proceeded to violently and forcibly remove the peaceful gathering of people in the park in front of the parliamentarian. The police then told the dislodged people on the streets around Platz der Republik to go to Brandenburgertor. More than 100 people then regrouped at Pariserplatz near Brandenburgertor to make a new assembly. In that assembly it was decided to come back the next day at 13:00 at Pariserplatz to continue the movement. As soon had this decision been made that the police made renewed threats to the people. The people then decided to leave for the moment and come back the next day. People from the protest reported that the police blocked sms and Twitter communication containing certain key words such as "occupyreichtag" or "occupywallst" during periods of the day. The protest became ongoing and continues as Occupy Berlin.

Frankfurt
Frankfurt in Germany, where 8000 people gathered in front of the European Central Bank
Frankfurt headquarters on the first day of a worldwide protest against income disparity and corporate greed. Organizers declared they would occupy and blockade the square in front of the ECB "for an undefined period of time." Demonstrators set up a protest camp like those in Madrid and New York with 109 tents and 9 pavilions, soup kitchen and bread line, facility's, generators, W-Lan and live stream and a media team with its own podcast called Klargestellt (German for clarified).

Stuttgart
Around 5000 people supported the global protest at the "schlossplatz"

Hamburg
Between 2,000 and 5,000 people joined the rally on 15 October. Since then, a protest camp with currently around 15 tents (as of 22 Oct) is located in front of the HSH Nordbank headquarter.

Cyprus
A small number of Greek and Turkish Cypriot activists gathered in Eleftheria Square in Nicosia as a response to the global call for a protest. Through discussion, they decided to move their protest to the buffer zone located in the Ledra/Lokmacı street. This started the Occupy Buffer Zone movement in Cyprus. The movement had a strong focus on the Cyprus Dispute and its relation to the economic status quo.

United Kingdom
A group of protesters organized an occupation of the London Stock Exchange to bring attention to what they see as unethical behavior on the part of banks. By 2:30 pm, police had contained the crowd near the St. Paul's Cathedral, where Wikileaks founder Julian Assange held a speech, stating that Wikileaks would support the protests through a campaign against financial institutions. A similar protest group inspired by Occupy Wall Street has formed in the UK under the name OccupyLSX. Prostestors also marched through the Scottish Capital, Edinburgh and formed a tented encampment on St Andrew's Square to kick off Occupy Edinburgh.

Ireland
In Ireland protests were held throughout the country, including in Dublin and Cork. Now the demonstrations are spreading to Galway as described by The Irish Times. In the same article this newspaper describes the movement in the following terms: The group has no hierarchical structure, has set up a Facebook page and Twitter account – with the social media links attracting a very mixed, and sometimes critical, reaction. The protest in Dublin was organized by the Real Democracy Now! Ireland, Causes United (Ireland) & Occupy Dame Street protest, set up outside the Central Bank of Ireland in solidarity with the Occupy Wall Street movement in New York, also continued throughout the day.

Slovenia
In Slovenia protesters gathered in Koper, Maribor and the capital, Ljubljana, with the latter being the most prominent one. In Koper around 300 people gathered to protest against corruption, capitalism and also against Port of Koper, which is accused of violation of workers' rights. in the capital, people gathered on Congress Square to protest against greed, corruption and capitalism in general. They later moved to Ljubljana Stock Exchange where an assembly was called. The participants decided to continue the protest by means of symbolic occupation. In the following days, the camp size has risen to some 30 tents with continuing assemblies averaging between 150 and 200 participants, before ceasing in early 2012.

Finland
In Finland there were gatherings at 13 locations. The largest meeting was held at the Narinkkatori square in Helsinki where about 1000 people attended during the day, according to the organizers. Several hundred people gathered also in Turku, Tampere and Jyväskylä.

Hungary
In Hungary there were demonstrations at two cities. A gathering with an assembly and marching was held in the capitol Budapest where about 1500 people attended during the day, according to the police and organizers. Several dozen people gathered also in Pécs.

North America

United States

15 October was the day that many local offshoots of Occupy Wall Street started, mainly in smaller cities. Most of the big cities already had Occupy movements that people from the smaller cities and towns came to.

In New York City, after police prepared to evict protesters from Zuccotti Park near Wall Street, the protesters marched into the heart of the city where they gathered 10,000 supporters. 76 were arrested, 45 in Times square and 24 at a branch of Citibank. Protests also took place in hundreds of major cities across the US like Washington, Boston, Philadelphia, San Francisco, Los Angeles, Chicago, Miami, and Dallas and smaller communities like Champaign–Urbana, Memphis Oklahoma City, Buffalo, and Fort Lauderdale.

Latin America

Protests were organized in dozens of cities, including in Chile, Brazil, Peru and Mexico.

Middle East and North Africa

Protests were organized in dozens of cities and countries, including in Egypt, Tunisia and Israel.

Arrests

United States
100 were arrested in Boston, 76 in New York, 175 in Chicago, 50 in Phoenix, 19 in Sacramento, 20 in Raleigh., and 24 in Denver.

Italy
12 were arrested in Rome after a part of the protest turned violent.

List of gatherings by city

See also 
Note. Cities with 'Occupy' articles are in the show-hide table below.

 Occupy movement
 Timeline of Occupy Wall Street
 We are the 99%
Other U.S. protests
 2011 United States public employee protests
 2011 Wisconsin protests

Other international protests
 2009 Iranian presidential election protests
 Anti-austerity movement in Greece
 Anti-austerity movement in Portugal
 Anti-austerity movement in the United Kingdom and 2010 UK student protests
 2011–2012 Chilean student protests
 2011 Israeli social justice protests
 Iceland Kitchenware Revolution
 Spanish 15M Indignants movement
 Time for Outrage!

Related articles
 Bank Transfer Day
 Corruption Perceptions Index
 Economic inequality
 Grassroots movement
 Impact of the Arab Spring
 Income inequality in the United States
 List of countries by distribution of wealth
 List of countries by income equality
 Plutocracy
 Wealth inequality in the United States

References

External links

Occupy movement
2011 protests
Global protests